The women's tandem 1 km time trial B at the 2018 Commonwealth Games, was part of the cycling programme, which took place on 7 April 2018. This event was for blind and visually impaired cyclists riding with a sighted pilot.

As only three nations entered the event, per Commonwealth Games regulations, no silver or bronze medal was available.

Records
Prior to this competition, the existing world and Games records were as follows:

Results

References

Cycling at the Commonwealth Games – Women's tandem 1 km time trial B
Women's tandem 1 km time trial B